Międzyrzecze may refer to the following places in Poland:
Międzyrzecze, Lower Silesian Voivodeship (south-west Poland)
Międzyrzecze, Podlaskie Voivodeship (north-east Poland)
Międzyrzecze, Silesian Voivodeship (south Poland)
 Międzyrzecze Dolne (south Poland)
 Międzyrzecze Górne (south Poland)
Międzyrzecze, West Pomeranian Voivodeship (north-west Poland)